Juan Carlos Ramírez (born 22 March 1972) is a Colombian footballer. He played in 30 matches for the Colombia national football team from 1999 to 2005. He was also part of Colombia's squad for the 1999 Copa América tournament.

References

External links
 

1972 births
Living people
Colombian footballers
Colombia international footballers
Association football midfielders
Footballers from Medellín